Borno Youth Movement (BYM) was a Nigerian political party founded on June 26, 1954. The party was founded by young radicals of Kanuri heritage who were indignant with the administrative course of native authorities in Borno and wanted to reform the authority.

The entry of Ibrahim Imam to the party led to an upswing in the fortunes of the party in Borno. Ibrahim Imam had earlier resigned his position as secretary-general of NPC and had joined NEPU. He merged NEPU activities in Borno with that of the youth movement. However, the alliance with NEPU hit the rocks in 1958, after which BYM forged a new alliance with the Action Group.

References
K. W. J. Post; The Nigerian Federal Election of 1959: Politics and Administration in a Developing Political System, Oxford University Press, 1963

Defunct political parties in Nigeria
Political parties established in 1954
Politics of Borno State
1954 establishments in Nigeria